Anything is an album by Kinnie Starr, released in 2006 on MapleMusic Recordings.

The album's title track was the first-ever #1 single on CBC Radio 3's new countdown show The R3-30.

Track listing

 "Step Back"
 "Anything"
 "La Le La La" (feat. Tegan Quin)
 "Rock the Boat"
 "Up in Smoke"
 "Please Hold My Hand"
 "Sex in the Prairies"
 "Blackbrown Eyes"
 "Wind in Your Sail"
 "Walking Away"
 "Not Enough"

Album Personnel

Additional Personnel

Tegan Quin - Vocals on "La Le Lala".

Production
 Howard Redekopp - Producer, Engineer, Mixer

References

2006 albums
Kinnie Starr albums
MapleMusic Recordings albums